Azucena Galettini (Buenos Aires, 1981) is an Argentinean writer and translator. She holds a BA in Latin-American Literature by Universidad de Buenos Aires and a BA in Translation (English-Spanish) by Instituto en Educación Superior en Lenguas Vivas “J. R. Fernández”.

Her short stories book Lo único importante en el mundo was awarded a mention of honor by Fondo Nacional de las Artes in 2006 and was published by El Fin de la Noche in 2010. The following year it was shortlisted in Premio Internacional de Cuento para Libro Édito “Juan José Manauta” selected among some 500 books. In 2012 it was incorporated to the portal by Fundación del Libro “Books from Argentina”, created for fostering the translation of Argentinean writers.

Her novel La primera de las tres virtudes was shortlisted for the Premio Internacional de Novela “Letra Sur” in 2012, selected from more than 300 manuscripts.

From 2011 to 2015 she was Editor in Chief in the literary magazine La Balandra (otra narrativa).

She is part of the anthologies Santos Paganos (Alto Pogo publishing house), Panorama Interzona. Narrativas emergentes de la Argentina, (Interzona publishing house) y Ante el fin del mundo (UnLa publishing house).

References

External links
 Author's Webpage
 “Futuro” short story in Lo único importante en el mundo. 
  Video interview in Cuento mi libro

20th-century Argentine writers
21st-century Argentine writers
Argentine women short story writers
Writers from Buenos Aires
21st-century Argentine women writers
20th-century Argentine women writers
20th-century Argentine short story writers
21st-century Argentine short story writers
1981 births
Living people